Naomi McClure-Griffiths  (born July 11, 1975) is an American-born astrophysicist and radio astronomer who researches and lives in Australia. In 2004, she discovered a new spiral arm in the Milky Way galaxy. She was awarded the Prime Minister's Malcolm McIntosh Prize for Physical Scientist in 2006 and in 2015 was honored for her research in physics by receipt of the Pawsey Medal from the Australian Academy of Science. This was followed by an Australian Laureate Fellowship in 2021, while in 2022 she was elected a Fellow of the Australian Academy of Science.

Biography
Naomi Melissa McClure-Griffiths was born on July 11, 1975 in Atlanta Georgia. She entered Oberlin College in 1993 where she studied both French and physics and then in 1997 entered the University of Minnesota to study astrophysics.   During her PhD, she participated in the International Galactic Plane Survey, leading the Southern Galactic Plane Survey to map the hydrogen gas in the Milky Way. In 2001, she relocated permanently to Australia taking up a post doctoral fellowship at the Australia Telescope National Facility as a CSIRO Bolton Fellow.

During her Fellowship McClure-Griffiths studied the movement of interstellar gases and how explosions of stars create bubbles or shells which push the gasses out of the galaxy. In their movement, chimneys of empty space may be created, two of which were discovered by McClure-Griffiths. One of the chimneys she discovered is the only known chimney to "extend through the top and bottom of the galactic plane". Then in 2004, she discovered a new spiral arm during her senior postdoctoral position. The new arm was shown on previous mappings but never identified nor given a name. McCure-Griffiths created a computer model to confirm its existence which was confirmed by her team. In 2006, she was honored with the Malcolm McIntosh Prize for Physical Scientist of the year one of the annual prizes awarded as the Prime Minister's Prizes for Science. As Principal Investigator she initiated the Galactic All Sky Survey that same year and then in 2007, she was the recipient of the Powerhouse Wizard Award from the Powerhouse Museum at the Sydney Observatory. McClure-Griffiths' team took part in the international effort to complete the mapping of the Milky Way's magnetic fields in 2011. In 2015, she left CSIRO and joined the Australian National University as a professor conducting her research from the Mount Stromlo Observatory. That same year, her work in physics was recognized by receipt of the Pawsey Medal from the Australian Academy of Science.

Selected works

References

External links 
WorldCat Publications

American astrophysicists
Australian astrophysicists
Women astrophysicists
1975 births
Living people
Women astronomers
Australian women physicists
Oberlin College alumni
University of Minnesota alumni
21st-century Australian astronomers
21st-century Australian physicists
21st-century Australian women scientists
Fellows of the Australian Academy of Science